Dennis Leonard is a sound editor. He was nominated at the 77th Academy Awards for the film The Polar Express in the category of Best Sound Editing. His nomination was shared with Randy Thom.

Selected filmography

Minions (2015)
War Story (2014) - Sound Designer/Re-Recording Mixer, Supervising Sound Editor/Re-Recording Mixer (according to Skywalker Sound and IMDb's bio pages)
Free Birds (2013)
Despicable Me 2 (2013)
Flight (2012) - Sound Designer & Supervising Sound Editor (according to Soundworks Collection), Supervising Sound Editor/Re-Recording Mixer
The Lorax (2012)
Madagascar 3: Europe's Most Wanted (2012)
Olive (2011) - Supervising Sound Editor (as Dennis "Wiz" Leonard)/Role: Doctor
Cowboys & Aliens (2011) - Additional Re-Recording Mixer (uncredited)
Rio (2011) - Additional Re-Recording Mixer (uncredited)
Despicable Me (2010)
Merry Madagascar (2009)
A Christmas Carol (2009)
Horton Hears a Who! (2008)
Madagascar: Escape 2 Africa (2008)
Enchanted (2007)
Harry Potter and the Goblet of Fire (2005)
The Polar Express (2004)
Shrek 2 (2004)
Harry Potter and the Chamber of Secrets (2002)
Cast Away (2000)
What Lies Beneath (2000) - Supervising Sound Editor, Skywalker Sound Administrator/Additional Foley Artist (uncredited)
Species (1995) - Additional Sound Designer/Sound Editor (uncredited)
All Dogs Go To Heaven 2 (1995) - rumored to be Supervising Sound Editor (on IMDb )
All Dogs Go To Heaven (1989) - rumored to be Supervising Sound Editor (on IMDb )
Tucker: The Man and His Dream (1988) - Post-Production Sound Engineer (uncredited)

References

External links
 
 http://www.skysound.com/people/dennis-leonard/

Sound editors
Living people
Year of birth missing (living people)